Wolfgang Rolff (born 26 December 1959) is a German football manager and former player.

Playing career
Rolff played in 356 Bundesliga matches (47 goals) for Hamburger SV, Bayer 04 Leverkusen, Bayer 05 Uerdingen, Karlsruher SC and 1. FC Köln. He further took part in 126 2. Bundesliga matches (23 goals) for OSC Bremerhaven and SC Fortuna Köln, having a spell in France with RC Strasbourg for whom he scored four goals in 30 games in Ligue 2. In his years with his clubs, he won the Bundesliga title with Hamburg in 1983 and was part of the Hamburg side that clinched the European Cup against Juventus in Athens the same summer, five years later he won the UEFA Cup with Bayer 04 Leverkusen in 1988.

Reputed as a tireless midfielder, Rolff debuted for West Germany in 1983 and was part of the UEFA Euro 1984 and the UEFA Euro 1988 squad of his nation. On both occasions he featured twice each in games of West Germany, making also two appearances for the West Germans in their runner-up campaign at the 1986 FIFA World Cup in Mexico. In total he played in 37 international matches until 1989.

Coaching career
His former Hamburg teammate Felix Magath appointed Rolff as assistant at Hamburger SV in 1997. In 1998 Rolff took sole charge of SV Meppen for six months until the club's relegation from the 2. Bundesliga. He went on working as assistant to his former Karlsruhe manager Winfried Schäfer at VfB Stuttgart and was, shortly after, named caretaker manager of Die Schwaben. In 2000–01, he worked in the coaching staff of former Germany coach Berti Vogts during Vogts' reign as manager of Bayer 04 Leverkusen, also one of Rolff's ex-clubs. Subsequent to Vogts' departure from Leverkusen in 2001, Rolff worked as assistant to Vogts after Vogts had been hired to guide Kuwait. Rolff did not follow Vogts to Scotland, indeed, and was in July 2004 employed by SV Werder Bremen as assistant manager. After the sacking of Thomas Schaaf, Rolff, along with Matthias Hönerbach, was interim head coach from 15 May 2013 until 27 May 2013, when Robin Dutt became the new head coach.

Coaching record

Honours

Player
Hamburger SV
 European Cup: 1982–83
 UEFA Super Cup: runner-up 1983
 Intercontinental Cup: runner-up 1983

Bayer Leverkusen
 UEFA Cup: 1987–88

West Germany
 FIFA World Cup: runner-up 1986

Manager
Al-Salmiya
 Kuwait Crown Prince Cup: 2015–16

References

External links
 
 
 

1959 births
Living people
West German expatriate footballers
German footballers
Germany international footballers
Germany under-21 international footballers
Association football midfielders
OSC Bremerhaven players
Hamburger SV players
Bayer 04 Leverkusen players
Karlsruher SC players
1. FC Köln players
RC Strasbourg Alsace players
Expatriate footballers in France
UEFA Euro 1984 players
1986 FIFA World Cup players
UEFA Euro 1988 players
Bundesliga players
2. Bundesliga players
KFC Uerdingen 05 players
SC Fortuna Köln players
VfB Stuttgart managers
Bundesliga managers
UEFA Cup winning players
SV Meppen managers
German football managers
Shandong Taishan F.C. non-playing staff
Eintracht Frankfurt non-playing staff
SV Werder Bremen non-playing staff
Hannover 96 non-playing staff
Hamburger SV non-playing staff
Bayer 04 Leverkusen non-playing staff
VfB Stuttgart non-playing staff
West German expatriate sportspeople in France
West German footballers